Pareek College is located in Jaipur city in Rajasthan state in India, in the Bani Park area. It offers undergraduate, postgraduate and professional courses like BBA and BCA. 

S.S.G. Pareek College was pronounced a Heritage College in 2001 by the University Grants Commission, New Delhi.

Facilities

Library

Chemistry Laboratory

Botany Laboratory

Zoology Laboratory

Physics Laboratory

Computer Laboratory

Geography Laboratory

Music Laboratory

External links

Related Institutions Of SSG Pareek PG College
 SSG Pareek PG College
 SSG Pareek PG Girls College Jaipur
 SSG Pareek PG Girls College Chomu
 SSG Pareek PG College Of Education
 SSG Pareek Group Of Schools

Universities and colleges in Jaipur
University of Rajasthan
Educational institutions established in 1965
1965 establishments in Rajasthan